Sminthurides bifidus is a species of globular springtail in the family Sminthurididae.

References

External links

 

Collembola
Articles created by Qbugbot
Animals described in 1934